The Interview Waiver Program (IWP), also called the Visa Interview Waiver Program, is a program managed by the U.S. Department of State's Bureau of Consular Affairs under which, under some circumstances, interview requirements can be waived for some nonimmigrant visa applicants.

An executive order by Donald Trump on January 27, 2017 asked for an immediate suspension of the Interview Waiver Program, pending review for compliance with Section 222 of the INA, 8 U.S.C. 1222, which requires that all individuals seeking a nonimmigrant visa undergo an in-person interview, subject to specific statutory exceptions.

Conditions for the Interview Waiver Program 

According to the Foreign Affairs Manual (FAM), 9 FAM 403.5-4, a consular officer may waive an interview for a visa applicant if any of these four conditions apply. Some of the content of the FAM is not available to the public.

Not all embassies and consulates need to implement all the waiver criteria of the IWP. In particular, some consulates may implement the IWP for only a subset of the criteria, and may impose additional criteria. For instance, the embassy in Georgetown, Guyana has implemented the IWP only for the B-1/B-2, C-1/C2, and D visa types. Similarly, the consulate in Matamoros, Mexico has set the age threshold for the age-based interview waiver for children at 7 years instead of 14 years.

Interview waiver based on age (9 FAM 403.5-4(A)(1)) 

If none of the grounds mandating an in-person interview apply, a waiver may be given to applicants who satisfy either of the following two conditions:

 under 14 years of age; or
 over 79 years of age

Interview waiver for diplomats or officials 9 FAM 403.5-4(A)(2)) 

Interviews may be waived for either of the following visa types:

 Any of the following:
 A-1 visa for ambassadors, ministers, diplomats, consular officers, and their immediate family members
 A-2 visa for government officials, employees, their immediate families, their technical and support staff
 C-3 visa for government officials and their families (the C-3 visa for attendants, servants, and employees is not eligible for an interview waiver)
 G-1 visa for designated principal resident representatives of foreign governments and their staff and immediate family members
 G-2 visa (similar to G-1 except that there is no work authorization)
 G-3 visa (identical to G-2 visa)
 G-4 visa
 NATO-1 visa
 NATO-2 visa
 NATO-3 visa
 NATO-4 visa
 NATO-5 visa
 NATO-6 visa
 TECRO E-1 visa
 Any applicant for a diplomatic or official visa as described in 22 CFR 41.26 or 22 CFR 41.27, respectively.

Interview waiver for renewals (within one year or 12-48 months after expiry) (9 FAM 403.5-4(A)(3)) 

Interview waivers can be used in cases of people reapplying for the same visa class that they previously held, if either of the following two cases apply and none of the grounds for mandating an in-person interview apply:

 Renewals within one year: An interview may be waived for an applicant applying for renewing a visa that is still valid or expired less than a year ago, if the applicant is seeking renewal of the visa in the same classification (same visa class and same category (principal or derivative)). For instance, an F-1 visa holder can get an interview waiver for a F-1 visa, but a F-2 visa holder cannot. Any biometric requirements must have been met when issuing the previous visa, or fulfilled separately to qualify for the interview waiver. Note that F, J, and M visa holders have to satisfy additional requirements as noted after the bullet points.
 Renewal 12–48 months after expiry: All the following conditions must be satisfied:
 The visa must not be in the following categories: E visa, H visa, L visa, P visa, and R visa (note that F, J, and M visas have slightly different rules, as detailed after the bullet points).
 The visa is being renewed between 12 and 48 months after the prior visa's expiration date.
 The applicant must be a national or resident of the country in which he or she is applying for the visa
 The applicant has met all biometric requirements

Renewals for student and exchange visitor visas: Student and exchange visitor visas (F, J, and M) can be renewed using either of the above two methods but need to satisfy both these conditions:
 For F and M, either the program or the institution, or both, must be the same as for the original visa. For J visas, the SEVIS number must remain the same in order for the interview to be waived.
 The applicant must be in status according to SEVIS, and, in case of any discrepancies between the current and previous visa applications, or for any other reason, an interview may be requested.

Interview waiver for Argentines and Brazilians (9 FAM 403.5-4(A)(4)) 

If none of the grounds for mandating an in-person interview apply, an interview may be waived for a first-time Argentine or Brazilian visa applicant in a visa class other than E, H, L, P, or R if both the following conditions apply:
 The applicant is a first-time Argentine or Brazilian nonimmigrant visa applicant who is younger than 16 or 66 and older
 The applicant is applying in the consular district of his or her normal residence.

Conditions in which personal appearance may not be waived (9 FAM 403.5-6) 

Personal appearance may be waived for candidates who have been selected for interview based on randomization. There could be other reasons such as a past visa rejection, annotation of "Clearance Received" on the most recently issued visa, criminal record, history of immigration violations, or other red flags. However, the full list of reasons is not made publicly available in the Foreign Affairs Manual.

Implementation 

The Interview Waiver Program works as follows. Applicants apply for a visa by filling in Form DS-160 online, just as they would for a visa application with an interview. If they meet the conditions for an interview waiver, then instead of asking to schedule a visa interview appointment, the online interface will provide information or require an appointment to drop off the materials and collect biometric information.

History

Rollout 

The Interview Waiver Program has been rolled out gradually starting around 2011. The rollout has been incremental along two dimensions: the set of embassies and consulates where it is available, and the criteria for which an interview waiver is provided.

The IWP became available in India in March 2012 and its scope in India was expanded in November 2012.

The Interview Waiver Program became permanent in January 2014.

In a prepared statement at a hearing at the United States Senate Subcommittee on Tourism, Competitiveness, and Innovation on June 26, 2014, the U.S. Department of State Acting Assistant Secretary for Consular Affairs talked about the Department's efforts to continue expanding the Interview Waiver Program to more applicants and use cases through better fraud detection techniques. One of the examples she gave was making citizens of Visa Waiver Program member countries eligible for the IWP when applying for other nonimmigrant visas. The statement also said that the Department of State looked forward to working with the United States Congress to pass legislation that would enable the Department of State and U.S. Department of Homeland Security to expand the program further.

In November 2015, the IWP was expanded in India to cover people with H-1B visas whose employer had changed.

IWP was still being rolled out to additional countries as of 2016.

Suspension 

An executive order by Donald Trump on January 27, 2017, issued a week after Donald Trump assumed the office of President of the United States, asked for an immediate suspension of the Interview Waiver Program, pending review for compliance with Section 222 of the INA, 8 U.S.C. 1222, which requires that all individuals seeking a nonimmigrant visa undergo an in-person interview, subject to specific statutory exceptions. Dara Lind of Vox referred to the suspension of the IWP as the only concrete change to the visa screening process in Trump's executive order.

At around the same time as the executive order, Trump fired many key executives of the U.S. Department of State, including Michele Thoren Bond, who had delivered the statement about IWP in June 2014. Her testimony was also removed from the website of the Department of State's Bureau of Consular Affairs.

References 

Visa policy of the United States